The 1902 Guatemala earthquake occurred on April 18 at 8:23 pm with a moment magnitude of 7.5 and a maximum Mercalli intensity of VIII (Severe).

The foreshock and aftershock sequence of this incident were major. Before the main shock, there was an earthquake swarm which persisted for three months, and the tremors afterwards lasted for more than two weeks.

A majority of churches in western Guatemala and eastern Chiapas were either severely devastated or abolished. The number of people killed was between 800 and 2,000.

A strange occurrence of heavy rains, lightning, and thunder took place shortly before the earthquake. A few weeks before the earthquake there was rain every afternoon for several days straight. Guatemala City was instantly flooded when massive gaps opened in the streets, water pipes ruptured, and huts along with cathedrals disintegrated and collapsed, which also buried hundreds. In just one hour, approximately 80,000 people were made homeless.

As soon as the earthquake took place the sky cleared up and there was no rain for approximately three weeks. It has been said that the earthquake had something to do with an atmospheric disturbance connected with an electrical nature. The reason for this is because the early storms were electrical storms.

See also
List of earthquakes in Guatemala

References

Sources

External links 
Historic World Earthquakes – United States Geological Survey
Principales Eventos Sísmicos Del Siglo XX En Guatemala – Instituto Nacional de Sismología, Vulcanología, Meteorología e Hidrolagía

1902
Earthquake
1902 earthquakes
April 1902 events